The Helsinki Philharmonic Orchestra (literal English translation: Helsinki City Orchestra; commonly abbreviated as HPO) is an orchestra based in Helsinki, Finland.  Founded in 1882 by Robert Kajanus, the Philharmonic Orchestra was the first permanent orchestra in the Nordic countries. Today, its primary concert venue is the Helsinki Music Centre; the current chief conductor is Susanna Mälkki, who has held her post since 2016.

History

Early history
In 1882, with the backing of two wealthy businessmen (Waldemar Klärich and Nikolai Sinebrychoff), the Finnish composer and conductor Robert Kajanus founded the Helsinki Orchestral Association, the first permanent orchestra in the Nordic countries. Kajanus, who took no salary in the first year, conducted the Orchestral Association in its inaugural concert, on 3 October 1882; the program included, among other pieces, Beethoven's Symphony No. 5 in C minor, Mendelssohn's concert overture The Hebrides, and Weber's overture Jubel in E major. The orchestra comprised  musicians from Imperial Germany and Imperial Russia, and sensing a need to guarantee the Orchestral Association a supply of domestically-trained musicians, Kajanus on 1 October 1885 founded an attendant music school; initially, the music school employed as its instructors the very foreign musicians it sought, in time, to replace with Finns.  In the summer of 1894, the Orchestral Association—worried that its name implied amateurism—renamed itself the Helsinki Philharmonic Society; at the same meeting, it changed its rules to allow female students to enroll in the orchestra's music school, although  discrimination continued.

In 1912, the Finnish conductor Georg Schnéevoigt—who had served as the principal cellist of the Philharmonic Society from 1895 to 1912 and taught cello at the orchestra school from 1896 to 1902—founded the Helsinki Symphony Orchestra. A bitter "feud" between the two competing organizations ensued: with 150,000 residents, Helsinki could not sustain rival orchestras, especially with the Swedish-speaking patrons supporting Schnéevoigt and the Finnish-speakers backing Kajanus. The city recognized the situation was unsustainable, and although each group proposed initially that the other should disband, the two merged and municipalized in 1914 under a new name, the Helsinki Philharmonic Orchestra (literally, the Helsinki City Orchestra). In part, the resolution was due to the dawn of the First World War in July 1914: the Helsinki Symphony Orchestra collapsed after the German musicians who formed its backbone were expelled from the country; Kajanus and Schnéevoigt initially co-served as chief conductors of the Philharmonic Orchestra, which then consisted of forty players surviving on starvation wages. During this time, the Philharmonic Orchestra struggled to survive: not only did Kajanus and Schnéevoigt quarrel with each other through the press, but also there were not—despite the orchestral school having been open for decades—enough Finnish musicians to supply the orchestra; in response, Kajanus sought to recruit musicians from neutral countries such as Denmark and the Netherlands. In 1916, Schnéevoigt left the Philharmonic Orchestra to assume the chief conductorship of the Stockholm Concert Society Orchestra.

Until 1962, it also served as the orchestra for the Finnish National Opera.

Modern era
Leif Segerstam was chief conductor of the orchestra from 1995 to 2007, and is now its chief conductor emeritus.  John Storgårds became principal guest conductor of the orchestra in 2003, and took up the chief conductorship of the orchestra in the autumn of 2008, with an initial contract of 4 years.  Following an initial renewal of his contract through 2014., in October 2013, the orchestra announced a further extension of Storgårds' contract through December 2015, at which time he stood down as chief conductor.  In September 2014, the orchestra announced the appointment of Susanna Mälkki as its next chief conductor, effective with the 2016–2017 season, with an initial contract of 3 years.  She is the first female conductor to be named to the post in the orchestra's history.  In October 2017, the orchestra announced the extension of Mälkki's contract as chief conductor through 2021.  In June 2019, the orchestra announced a further extension of her contract as chief conductor through 2023, with an option for a further 2-year extension past 2023.  In December 2021, the orchestra announced that Mälkki is to stand down as its chief conductor at the end of the 2022-2023 season, and subsequently to take the title of chief conductor emeritus with the orchestra.  In April 2022, the orchestra announced the appointments of Jukka-Pekka Saraste as its next chief conductor, Pekka Kuusisto as its next principal guest conductor, and Anna Clyne as its composer-in-residence, all effective with the 2023-2024 season.

The orchestra has recorded commercially for such labels as Ondine and Finlandia, as well as a smaller number for the EMI, Warner and Deutsche Grammophon labels.  In November 2011, the orchestra was the first ensemble to perform reported sketches for the Symphony No 8 of Jean Sibelius.

Chief conductors
 Robert Kajanus (1882–1932)
Georg Schnéevoigt (1914–1916; 1932–1940)
 Armas Järnefelt (1942–1943)
 Martti Similä (1945–1951)
 Tauno Hannikainen (1951–1963)
 Jorma Panula (1965–1972)
 Paavo Berglund (1975–1979)
 Ulf Söderblom (1978–1979)
 Okko Kamu (1981–1988)
 Sergiu Comissiona (1990–1993)
 Leif Segerstam (1995–2007)
 John Storgårds (2008–2015)
 Susanna Mälkki (2016–present)
 Jukka-Pekka Saraste (designate, effective 2023)

Notes

References

External links
 Official Finnish-language homepage of the Helsinki Philharmonic Orchestra.

1882 establishments in Finland
Organizations established in 1882
Musical groups established in 1882
Finnish orchestras
Music in Helsinki
Arts organizations established in the 1880s